The Cincinnati Mohawks was the name of two professional ice hockey teams in Cincinnati, Ohio who played their home games at the Cincinnati Gardens. The first Mohawks' club were members of the American Hockey League (AHL) between 1949 and 1952 while the second Mohawks' club played in the International Hockey League from 1952 to 1958.

In 1949, the Washington Lions relocated to Cincinnati and took on the name Mohawks. The club would be the first ice hockey team to serve the city of Cincinnati and were a farm team to the Montreal Canadiens from 1949 to 1951 and the New York Rangers from 1950 to 1952. The AHL variation of the Mohawks were less than impressive on the ice and finished last in their first two seasons. The club managed a playoff berth in the third season and advanced to the second round of the playoffs where they were knocked out by the Providence Reds 3 games to 1. However, during the AHL Mohawks three-year run, the club reportedly lost $200,000 so ownership decided to take a leave of absence from the league and reorganize. The organization formed a new company called the Cincinnati Mohawks, Inc., and obtained a franchise in the smaller and more manageable IHL.

The new Mohawks club were loaded with highly-talented young players such as Phil Goyette, Don Marshall, Charlie Hodge, Duke Edmundson, Billy Goold, John "Bun" Smith, Eddie Kachur, and coach Rollie McLenahan. Most of the club's players were provided by the Montreal Canadiens. While the Canadiens dominated the National Hockey League during the era, the Mohawks dominated the IHL. In their six-year stint in the league, Cincinnati's dynasty won six-straight regular season titles and five Turner Cup Championships. The IHL never saw another club match the Mohawks success during its 56-year run as a league.

Regular season 

Cincinnati Mohawks of the AHL

Cincinnati Mohawks of the IHL

Playoffs 

Cincinnati Mohawks of the AHL

Cincinnati Mohawks of the IHL

References

10-23-1975 - Cincinnati Enquirer (Page 57)

External links
AHL stats
IHL stats

International Hockey League (1945–2001) teams
Sports teams in Cincinnati
Defunct ice hockey teams in Ohio
Ice hockey clubs established in 1949
Ice hockey clubs disestablished in 1958
Montreal Canadiens minor league affiliates
New York Rangers minor league affiliates
1949 establishments in Ohio
1958 disestablishments in Ohio